Graytown is an unincorporated community located in the towns of New Haven in Dunn County and Vance Creek in Barron County, Wisconsin, United States. The community was named for Aaron B. Gray, a New Yorker who had opened a hotel in the mid-1870s.

Notes

Unincorporated communities in Barron County, Wisconsin
Unincorporated communities in Wisconsin
Unincorporated communities in Dunn County, Wisconsin